Magdalena Agnieszka Biejat (born 11 January 1982 in Warsaw) is a Polish translator of Spanish-language literature, social and political activist and feminist, and a member of the Sejm of the 9th term (from 2019). She is one of the co-leaders of Left Together (Razem).

Life 
Magdalena Biejat studied sociology at the University of Granada and Complutense University of Madrid.
Professionally she was a translator of Spanish-language literature. She is also associated with non-governmental organizations, incl. The Helsinki Foundation for Human Rights

In 2015, she joined the Left Together (Partia Razem) party and sat on the council of the Warsaw district.

In 2019, she became deputy chairman of The Left (Lewica) political alliance.

She has participated in multiple strikes against the tightening of the Polish abortion law and in Polish Pride Parades. On November 19, 2020, during one of the protests, she was attacked with tear gas by a policeman, despite not posing any threat and despite showing her MP ID. The worrying situation raised concerns about the brutality of the Polish police during street protests.

In 2022, she became one of the co-leaders of Left Together.

Private life 
She lives in the Praga district of Warsaw. She is married and mother of two children. She is a vegetarian

See also 
 Agnieszka Dziemianowicz-Bąk
 Paulina Matysiak
 Adrian Zandberg
 Left Together

References 

Complutense University of Madrid alumni
1982 births
Left Together politicians
Polish feminists
Living people